Maud Elisabeth Landby Eduards (born 28 February 1944) is a Swedish political scientist and gender studies scholar. She is professor emerita of political science at Stockholm University.

Eduards earned her PhD in 1985 with a dissertation on regional cooperation between Morocco, Algeria, Tunisia and Libya in the period 1962–1984. In 1996 she was appointed as professor of political science at Stockholm University. She was also professor of gender studies at the University of Oslo's Centre for Women's Studies/Centre for Women's and Gender Studies from 1999 to 2004. She is known for her research on women, peace and security policy. A Festschrift in her honour titled Kön, makt, nation was published in 2011.

Bibliography 
 Maud Eduards: "Feminism som partipolitik: Feministiskt initiativ i Simrishamn 2010-2014", Leopard, 2016
 Paulina de los Reyes, Maud Eduards, Fia Sundevall (eds.): "Internationella relationer - könskritiska perspektiv", Liber, 2013
 Maud Eduards and Maria Wendt: "Fienden mitt ibland oss: kön och nation i pressbevakningen av Feministiskt initiativ". In: Maria Jansson, Maria Wendt and Cecilia Åse (eds.): Den nationella väven : feministiska analyser, 2010
 Maud Eduards: ”Vad har ett badlakan med säkerhetspolitik att göra?”, in Lenita Freidenvall and Maria Jansson (eds.): Politik och kritik. En feministisk guide till statsvetenskap, Studentlitteratur 2010.
 Maud Eduards, Anna Wahl med flera: Motstånd och fantasi: historien om F. Studentlitteratur, 2008 
 Maud Eduards: Kroppspolitik. Om Moder Svea och andra kvinnor. Bokförlaget Atlas, Stockholm, 2007 
 Maud Eduards: "Våld utan gränser: om krig och hotad manlighet", in Yvonne Svanström and Kjell Östberg (eds.): Än män då? Kön och feminism i Sverige under 150 år, Atlas Akademi 2004
 Maud Eduards: Förbjuden handling - om kvinnors organisering och feministisk teori. Liber, 2002
 Maud Eduards,  Gunnel Gustafsson and Malin Rönnblom (eds.): Towards a New Democratic Order? Women's Organizing in Sweden in the 1990's. Publica, 1997

References

1944 births
Swedish political scientists
Academic staff of Stockholm University
Gender studies academics
Living people